Townsville Entertainment and Convention Centre is an indoor sports arena located in Townsville, Queensland, Australia. The capacity of the arena is 5,257 and was built in 1993.

Tenants
From 1993 until the end of the 2013–14 NBL season, the centre was the home arena of the Townsville Crocodiles basketball team. During Crocodiles games, the venue was commonly referred to as "The Swamp". Due to a downturn in attendance figures, the Crocs played at the Townsville RSL Stadium during the 2014–15 NBL season. In May 2015, the Crocodiles announced they would be returning to "The Swamp" for the 2015–16 season.

In 2021, the centre is set to become the new home arena for the Townsville Fire women's basketball team, ahead of the 2021–22 WNBL season. This move will see the centre now commonly referred to as "The Fire Pit".

See also
 List of indoor arenas in Australia

References

External links
Official website

Defunct National Basketball League (Australia) venues
Indoor arenas in Australia
Townsville Crocodiles
2018 Commonwealth Games venues
Basketball venues in Australia
Boxing venues in Australia
Sports venues in Townsville
Sports venues completed in 1993
Basketball at the 2018 Commonwealth Games